Goodson is an unincorporated community in Polk County, Missouri, United States. It is located at the intersection of Missouri Supplemental Routes C and P and is approximately sixteen miles northeast of Bolivar. Goodson is part of the Springfield, Missouri Metropolitan Statistical Area.

Goodson was laid out circa 1870, and named after Sam Goodson, an early citizen.  A post office called Goodson was in operation from 1874 until 1991.

References

Unincorporated communities in Polk County, Missouri
Springfield metropolitan area, Missouri
Unincorporated communities in Missouri